Reinder and Reindert are Dutch masculine given names derived from Reinier and Reinhard, which are cognate with Rainier Rein.

People with the name include :

Reinder
Reinder Boomsma (1879–1943), Dutch footballer
 (1872–1957), Dutch bacteriologist and university president
Reinder Dijkhuis (born 1971), Dutch comics artist
Reinder Lubbers (born 1984), Dutch rower
Reinder Nummerdor (born 1976), Dutch volleyball player
Reinder van de Riet (1939–2008), Dutch computer scientist
Reinder Strikwerda (1930–2006), Dutch orthopedic surgeon
Reindert
Reindert Brasser (1912–1999), Dutch discus thrower
Reindert de Favauge (1872–1949), Dutch sport shooter
Reindert B.J. "Rein" de Waal (1904–1985), Dutch field hockey player
 (1942–2006), Dutch painter, sculptor and architect

See also 
 Reinders, derived patronymic surname

References 

Dutch masculine given names